The Thomas Mann Building, completed in 1890, is located in Portland, Oregon's Yamhill Historic District.

External links
 
 Thomas Mann Building at Emporis

1890 establishments in Oregon
Buildings and structures completed in 1890
Buildings and structures in Portland, Oregon
Southwest Portland, Oregon